Berea International Theological Seminary (changed from Berea University of Graduate Studies) is an international theological seminary located in Yeongdeungpo district of Seoul, South Korea. The chairperson of board members is Rev. Ki-Dong Kim, who has not only established the seminary in Seoul in 1997 but also founded Sung-Rak Church in 1969, one of the mega churches in the spirit of Baptist teaching. The seminary offers various graduate degree programmes such as Master of Divinity (M.Div.), Master of Theology (Th.M.), Doctor of Theology (Th.D.), Doctor of Education (Ed.D.), and Doctor of Philosophy (Ph.D.). It also offers two diplomas in Advanced Spiritual Leadership Program and Theological Studies for lay Christians who want to serve their own local Christian community.

See also
List of colleges and universities in South Korea
Education in South Korea

External links 
 Official school website, in English

Universities and colleges in Seoul
Seminaries and theological colleges in South Korea
Yeongdeungpo District
Educational institutions established in 1997
1997 establishments in South Korea